The Max Planck Institute for Demographic Research (MPIDR) is located in Rostock, Germany. It was founded in 1996 by James Vaupel and moved into new buildings in Rostock in 2002. It is one of approximately 80 institutes of the Max Planck Society.

The MPIDR is jointly led by Emilio Zagheni, who took over from MPIDR founding director James Vaupel in February 2018, and Mikko Myrskylä. Myrskylä replaced Joshua R. Goldstein in 2014, who had taken over from Jan Hoem.

History and background
After the Institut national d'études démographiques, the MPIDR is the largest demographic research body in Europe and one of the largest in the world. Conducting basic research into demographic processes, it analyzes the underlying causes of demographic change, describes contemporary demographic trends, produces forecasts for the future direction of demographic processes, highlights the potential consequences facing society, and assists decision-makers in the various political and social institutions by providing them with solid information and expert advice. The institute is participating in four international doctoral training programs: The International Max Planck Research School for Demography, the European Doctoral School of Demography (EDSD), the MaxNet Aging Research School (MNARS), and the PhD program Demography at Rostock University.

Within the framework of the Rostock Center, a joint initiative between the MPIDR and Rostock University, the institute provides decision-makers in politics and society with information and expert advice on the causes and consequences of demographic change.

Since 2009, the MPIDR hosts Population Europe a collaborative network of Europe's leading demographic research institutes and centres, whose main activity is to spread information on policy relevant demographic research findings.

Laboratories 
 Demographic Data (Dmitri A. Jdanov)
 Digital and Computational Demography (Emilio Zagheni)
 Fertility and Well-Being (Mikko Myrskylä)
 Population Health (Mikko Myrskylä)
 Statistical Demography (Jutta Gampe)
 Labor Demography (Mikko Myrskylä)
 Lifespan Inequalities (Alyson van Raalte)
 Mathematical and Actuarial Demography (Roland Rau)
 Gender Gaps in Health and Survival (Anna Oksuzyan)

See also 
 Extreme longevity tracking
 Institut national d'études démographiques
 Population Association of America
 Population Reference Bureau
 Population Europe

References 

 http://www.ced.uab.cat/index.php?newlang=eng&module=pagesetter&func=viewpub&tid=8&pid=288

External links 

 Official website of the MPIDR
 Publications of the MPIDR on the Max-Planck eDoc Server
 Homepage of James Vaupel
 Homepage of Joshua Goldstein
 Homepage of Jan Hoem

Demographic Research
Social science institutes
University of Rostock